Ram Shiromani Verma is an Indian politician. He was elected to the Lok Sabha, lower house of the Parliament of India from Shravasti Lok Sabha constituency, Uttar Pradesh in the 2019 Indian general election as member of the Bahujan Samaj Party.

Political career
In March 2019, Mahagathbandhan, the grand alliance of Samajwadi Party, Bahujan Samaj Party and Rashtriya Lok Dal announced that Verma would contest the upcoming 2019 Indian general election from Shravasti constituency on the symbol of Bahujan Samaj Party. On 23 May, he was elected to the Lok Sabha after defeating Daddan Mishra, his nearest rival and sitting MP from Bharatiya Janata Party by a margin of 5,320 votes. Verma was polled 440,944 votes. After getting elected, he said that building a college, repairing roads and demanding an expansion of railways in his constituency were his priorities. Being a businessman, he is seldom seen in his constituency.

References

External links
MyNeta

Living people
Bahujan Samaj Party politicians
India MPs 2019–present
Year of birth missing (living people)